Ippolito Lante Montefeltro della Rovere (15 June 1618 – 29 June 1688) was an Italian nobleman and Duke of Bomarzo.

Biography 
Lante was the son of Marcantonio Lante (1566–1643) and his wife Lucrezia della Rovere. He was nephew to his father's brother, Cardinal Marcello Lante della Rovere. His brother, Lodovico Lante married Olimpia Cesi, daughter of Federico Cesi, Duke of Acquasparta.

He purchased the Villa at Bagnaia and it became known as the Villa Lante. He made a number of significant improvements to the Villa and its gardens and commissioned Pietro da Cortona to paint the Allegory of War and Peace. Many of Cortona's previous commissions had come from the Barberini family including Pope Urban VIII and Francesco Barberini. Lante later became close to Francesco's nephew, Maffeo Barberini (Prince of Palestrina) who spent some time in residence at the Villa Lante.

Lante's plan had been to alter the villa with more baroque art and architecture to move the estate away from the defensive military style with which it had first been built. Some of his plan was accomplished but the buildings remain a mix of architectural types.

He also owned the Villa Lante al Gianicolo in Rome. Lante died 29 June 1688 in that city.

Family 
They had four children:

 Antonio Lante Montefeltro della Rovere, (1648–1716) who inherited his father's titles and married Louise Angelique Charlotte de La Trémouille, sister of Marie Anne de La Trémoille.
 Marcello Lante Montefeltro della Rovere (born 1652)
Luigi Lante Montefeltro della Rovere (born 1653)
Lavinia Lante Montefeltro della Rovere (born 1655)
Angela Lante Montefeltro della Rovere (born 1658)

References 

1618 births
1688 deaths
Nobility from Rome
Montefeltro family
Ippolito